The Oklahoma Sooners college basketball team competes in the National Collegiate Athletic Association (NCAA) Division I, representing the University of Oklahoma in the Big 12 Conference. The Sooners have played their home games at the Lloyd Noble Center in Norman, Oklahoma since 1975.

Seasons

  Oklahoma vacated 13 regular season wins (and 4 conference wins) due to use of an ineligible player during the 2009–10 season.

References
General

Specific

Oklahoma Sooners
Oklahoma Sooners basketball seasons